The Regency of Algiers was a state in North Africa lasting from 1516 to 1830, until it was conquered by the French. Situated between the regency of Tunis in the east, the Sultanate of Morocco (from 1553) in the west and Tuat as well as the country south of In Salah in the south (and the Spanish and Portuguese possessions of North Africa), the Regency originally extended its borders from La Calle in the east to Trara in the west and from Algiers to Biskra, and afterwards spread to the present eastern and western borders of Algeria.

It had various degrees of autonomy throughout its existence, in some cases reaching complete independence, recognized even by the Ottoman sultan. The country was initially governed by governors appointed by the Ottoman sultan (1518–1659), rulers appointed by the Odjak of Algiers (1659–1710), and then Deys elected by the Divan of Algiers from (1710-1830).

History

Establishment

From 1496, the Spanish conquered numerous possessions on the North African coast: Melilla (1496), Mers El Kébir (1505), Oran (1509), Bougie (1510), Tripoli (1510), Algiers, Shershell, Dellys, and Tenes. The Spaniards later led unsuccessful expeditions to take Algiers in the Algiers expedition in 1516, 1519 and another failed expedition in 1541.

Around the same time, the Ottoman privateer brothers Oruç and Hayreddin—both known to Europeans as Barbarossa, or "Red Beard"—were operating successfully off Tunisia under the Hafsids. In 1516, Oruç moved his base of operations to Algiers. He asked for the protection of the Ottoman Empire in 1517, but was killed in 1518 during his invasion of the Zayyanid Kingdom of Tlemcen. Hayreddin succeeded him as military commander of Algiers.

In 1551 Hasan Pasha, the son of Hayreddin defeated the Spanish-Moroccan armies during a campaign to recapture Tlemcen, thus cementing Ottoman control in western and central Algeria.

After that, the conquest of Algeria sped up. In 1552 Salah Rais, with the help of some Kabyle kingdoms, conquered Touggourt, and established a foothold in the Sahara.

In the 1560s eastern Algeria was centralized, and the power struggle which had been present ever since the Emirate of Béjaïa collapsed came to an end.

During the 16th, 17th, and early 18th century, the Kabyle Kingdoms of Kuku and Ait Abbas managed to maintain their independence repelling Ottoman attacks several times, notably in the First Battle of Kalaa of the Beni Abbes. This was mainly thanks to their ideal position deep inside the Kabylia Mountains and their great organisation, and the fact that unlike in the West and East where collapsing kingdoms such as Tlemcen or Béjaïa were present, Kabylia had two new and energetic emirates.

Base in the war against Spain
Hayreddin Barbarossa established the military basis of the regency. The Ottomans provided a supporting garrison of 2,000 Turkish troops with artillery. He left Hasan Agha in command as his deputy when he had to leave for Constantinople in 1533. The son of Barbarossa, Hasan Pashan was in 1544 when his father retired, the first governor of the Regency to be directly appointed by the Ottoman Empire. He took the title of beylerbey. Algiers became a base in the war against Spain, and also in the Ottoman conflicts with Morocco.

Beylerbeys continued to be nominated for unlimited tenures until 1587. After Spain had sent an embassy to Constantinople in 1578 to negotiate a truce, leading to a formal peace in August 1580, the Regency of Algiers was a formal Ottoman territory, rather than just a military base in the war against Spain. At this time, the Ottoman Empire set up a regular Ottoman administration in Algiers and its dependencies, headed by Pashas, with 3-year terms to help considate Ottoman power in the Maghreb.

Mediterranean privateers

Despite the end of formal hostilities with Spain in 1580, attacks on Christian and especially Catholic shipping, with slavery for the captured, became prevalent in Algiers and were actually the main industry and source of revenues of the Regency.

In the early 17th century, Algiers also became, along with other North African ports such as Tunis, one of the bases for Anglo-Turkish piracy. There were as many as 8,000 renegades in the city in 1634. (Renegades were former Christians, sometimes fleeing the law, who voluntarily moved to Muslim territory and converted to Islam.) Hayreddin Barbarossa is credited with tearing down the Peñón of Algiers and using the stone to build the inner harbor.

A contemporary letter states:

Privateers and slavery of Christians originating from Algiers were a major problem throughout the centuries, leading to regular punitive expeditions by European powers. Spain (1567, 1775, 1783), Denmark (1770), France (1661, 1665, 1682, 1683, 1688), England (1622, 1655, 1672), all led naval bombardments against Algiers. Abraham Duquesne fought the Barbary pirates in 1681 and bombarded Algiers between 1682 and 1683, to help Christian captives.

Political Turmoil (1659-1713)

The Agha period 
In 1659 the Janissaries of the Odjak of Algiers took over the country, and removed the local Pasha with the blessing of the Ottoman Sultan. From there on a system of dual leaders was in place. There was first and foremost the Agha, elected by the Odjak, and the Pasha appointed by the Ottoman Sublime Porte, whom was a major cause of unrest. Of course, this duality was not stable. All of the Aghas were assassinated, without an exception. Even the first Agha was killed after only 1 year of rule. Thanks to this the Pashas from Constantinople were able to increase the power, and reaffirm Turkish control over the region. In 1671, the Rais, the pirate captains, elected a new leader, Mohamed Trik. The Janissaries also supported him, and started calling him the Dey, which means Uncle in Turkish.

Early Dey period (1671-1710) 

In the early Dey period the country worked similarly to before, with the Pasha still holding considerable powers, but instead of the Janissaries electing their own leaders freely, other factions such as the Taifa of Rais also wanted to elect the deys. Mohammed Trik, taking over during a time instability was faced with heavy issues. Not only were the Janissaries on a rampage, removing any leaders for even the smallest mistakes (even if those leaders were elected by them), but the native populace was also restless. The conflicts with European powers didn't help this either. In 1677, following an explosion in Algiers and several attempts at his life, Mohammed escaped to Tripoli leaving Algiers to Baba Hassan. Just 4 years into his rule he was already at war with one of the most powerful countries in Europe, the Kingdom of France. In 1682 France bombarded Algiers for the first time. The Bombardment was inconclusive, and the leader of the fleet Abraham Duquesne failed to secure the submission of Algiers. The next year, Algiers was bombarded again, this time liberating a few slaves. Before a peace treaty could be signed though, Baba Hassan was deposed and killed by a Rais called Mezzo Morto Hüseyin. Continuing the war against France he was defeated in a naval battle in 1685, near Cherchell, and at last a French Bombardment in 1688 brought an end to his reign, and the war. His successor, Hadj Chabane was elected by the Raïs. He defeated Morocco in the Battle of Moulouya and defeated Tunis as well. He went back to Algiers, but he was assassinated in 1695 by the Janissaries whom once again took over the country. From there on Algiers was in turmoil once again. Leaders were assassinated, despite not even ruling for a year, and the Pasha was still a cause of unrest. The only notable event during this time of unrest was the recapture of Oran and Mers-el-Kébir from the Spanish.

Coup of Baba Ali Chaouche, and independence 
Baba Ali Chaouche, also written as Chaouch, took over the country, ending the rule of the Janissaries. The Pasha attempted to resist him, but instead he was sent home, and told to never come back, and if he did he will be executed. He also sent a letter to the Ottoman sultan declaring that Algiers will from then on act as an independent state, and will not be an Ottoman vassal, but an ally at best. The Sublime Porte, enraged, tried to send another Pasha to Algiers, whom was then sent back to Constantinople by the Algerians. This marked the de facto independence of Algiers from the Ottoman Empire.

Danish–Algerian War

In the mid-1700s Dano-Norwegian trade in the Mediterranean expanded. In order to protect the lucrative business against piracy, Denmark–Norway had secured a peace deal with the states of Barbary Coast. It involved paying an annual tribute to the individual rulers and additionally to the States.

In 1766, Algiers had a new ruler, dey Baba Mohammed ben-Osman. He demanded that the annual payment made by Denmark-Norway should be increased, and he should receive new gifts. Denmark–Norway refused the demands. Shortly after, Algerian pirates hijacked three Dano-Norwegian ships and allowed the crew to be sold as slaves.

They threatened to bombard the Algerian capital if the Algerians did not agree to a new peace deal on Danish terms. Algiers was not intimidated by the fleet, the fleet was of 2 frigates, 2 bomb galiot and 4 ship of the line.

Algerian-Sharifian War 

In the west, the Algerian-Cherifian conflicts shaped the western border of Algeria.

There were numerous battles between the Regency of Algiers and the Sharifian Empires for example: the campaign of Tlemcen in 1551, the campaign of Tlemcen in 1557, the Battle of Moulouya and the Battle of Chelif. The independent Kabyle Kingdoms also had some involvement, the Kingdom of Beni Abbes participated in the campaign of Tlemcen in 1551 and the Kingdom of Kuku provided Zwawa troops for the capture of Fez in 1576 in which Abd al-Malik was installed as an Ottoman vassal ruler over the Saadi Dynasty. The Kingdom of Kuku also participated in the capture of Fez in 1554 in which Salih Rais defeated the Moroccan army and conquered Morocco up until Fez, adding these territories to the Ottoman crown and placing Ali Abu Hassun as the ruler and vassal to the Ottoman sultan. In 1792 the Regency of Algiers managed to take possession of the Moroccan Rif and Oujda, which they then abandoned in 1795 for unknown reasons.

Barbary Wars

During the early 19th century, Algiers again resorted to widespread piracy against shipping from Europe and the young United States of America, mainly due to internal fiscal difficulties, and the damage caused by the Napoleonic Wars. This in turn led to the First Barbary War and Second Barbary War, which culminated in August 1816 when Lord Exmouth executed a naval bombardment of Algiers, the biggest, and most successful one. The Barbary Wars resulted in a major victory for the American, British, and Dutch Navy.

French invasion

During the Napoleonic Wars, the Regency of Algiers had greatly benefited from trade in the Mediterranean, and of the massive imports of food by France, largely bought on credit by France. In 1827, Hussein Dey, Algeria's ruler, demanded that the restored Kingdom of France pay a 31-year-old debt contracted in 1799 by purchasing supplies to feed the soldiers of the Napoleonic Campaign in Egypt.

The French consul Pierre Deval refused to give answers satisfactory to the dey, and in an outburst of anger, Hussein Dey hit the consul with his fan. King Charles X used this as an excuse to break diplomatic relations and to start a full-scale invasion of the Algerian Regency on 14 June 1830: Algiers capitulated to the French on 5 July 1830 and Hussein Dey went into exile to Naples. The Regency was subsequently dismantled and its territory directly annexed to the Kingdom of France.

Charles X was overthrown a few weeks later by the July Revolution; however, the new monarch Louis Philippe I chose to continue the efforts of colonization of Algeria.

Administration

Territorial management 
The Regency was composed of various beyliks (provinces) under the authority of beys (vassals):

 The Beylik of Constantine in the east, with its capital in Constantine
 The Beylik of Titteri in the centre, with its capital being Médéa or Mazouna
 The Beylik of the West, with its capital being Mascara and then Oran

Each beylik was divided into  outan (counties) with at their head the caïds directly under the bey. To administer the interior of the country, the administration relied on the tribes called makhzen. These tribes were responsible for securing order and collecting taxes on the tributary regions of the country. It was through this system that, for three centuries, the State of Algiers extended its authority over the north of Algeria. However, society was still divided into tribes and dominated by maraboutic brotherhoods or local djouads (nobles). Several regions of the country thus only lightly recognised the authority of Algiers. Throughout its history, they formed numerous revolts, confederations, tribal fiefs or sultanates that fought with the regency for control. Before 1830, out of the 516 political units, a total of 200 principalities or tribes were considered independent because they controlled over 60% of the territory in Algeria and refused to pay taxes to Algiers.

Diwan 
The Divan of Algiers was started in the 16th century by the Odjak. It was seated in the Jenina Palace. This assembly, initially led by a Janissary Agha would soon go from a way to administer the Odjack to a central part of the country's administration. This change started in the 17th century, and the Diwan became an important part of the state, albeit it was still dominated by the Janissaries. Around 1628 the Divan was expanded to include 2 subdivisions. One called the private (Janissary) Divan (diwan khass), and the Public, or Grand Diwan (diwan âm). The latter was composed of Hanafi scholars and preachers, the raïs, and native notables. It numbered between 800 and 1500 people, but it was still less important than the Private Divan used by the Janissaries. During the period when Algiers was ruled by Aghas, the leader of the Divan was also the leader of the country. The Agha called himself the Hakem. In the 18th century, following the coup of Baba Ali Chaouche, the Divan was reformed. The grand divan was now the dominant one, and it was the main body of the government which elected the leader of the country, the Dey-Pacha. This new reformed Divan was composed of:

 Officials
 Ministers
 Tribal elders
 Moorish, Arab, and Berber Nobles
 Janissary commanders (Kouloughlis, and Turks)
 Rais (Pirate captains)
 Ulema

The Janissary Divan remained completely under the control of the Turkish Janissary commanders, albeit it lost all authority other than decisions in the affairs of Janissaries.

This Divan normally met once a week, albeit this wasn't always true, since if the Dey felt powerful enough he could simply stop the Divan's functions. At the beginning of their mandate, the deys consulted the divan on all important questions.

However, as the Deys became stronger, the Divan became weaker. By the 19th century, the Divan was mostly ignored, especially the private Janissary Divan. The dey's council, (also called Divan by the British) became more and more powerful. Dey Ali Khodja weakened the Janissary Divan to the point where they held no power. This angered the Turkish Janissaries, who launched a coup against the Dey. The coup failed, since the Dey successfully raised an army of Kabyle Zwawa cavalry, Arab infantry and Kouloughli troops. Many of the Turkish Janissaries were executed, while the rest fled. The Janissary Divan was abolished, and the Grand Divan was moved to the citadel of the Casbah.

Ministries 
The Dey, along with the Diwan, also relied and appointed 5 ministers to govern Algiers. These were the:

 Khaznadji, similar to the position of Prime minister, the Khaznadji also took care of the treasury
 Agha al-Mahalla, or supreme chief of the army, minister of internal affairs, and was also responsible for governing the Dar as-Soltan region of Algiers
 Khodjet al-Khil, was responsible for managing fiscal responsibilities, and collecting taxes. They also had the ceremonial role of "secretary of horses". They were assisted by a "Khaznadar".
 Wakil al-Kharaj, or minister of the navy of Algiers and foreign affairs.
 Bait al-Maldji, who was responsible for managing the tribes of the Makhzen of Algiers

These ministers were picked by the Dey of Algiers.

Armed forces

Levy warriors 
The levy militia composed from Arab-Berber warriors numbered in the tens of thousands, being overwhelmingly the largest part of the Algerian army. They were called upon from loyal tribes and clans, usually Makhzen ones. They numbered up to 50,000 in the Beylik of Oran alone. The troops were armed with muskets, usually moukahlas, and swords, usually either Nimchas or Flyssas, both of which were traditional local swords. The weaponry wasn't supplied by the state, and instead it was self-supplied. As nearly every peasant and tribesman owned a musket, it was expected from the soldiers to be equipped with one. As many of these tribes were traditionally warrior ones, many of these troops were trained since childhood, and thus were relatively effective especially in swordsmanship, albeit they were hampered by their weak organization, and by the 19th century their muskets became outdated.

Odjak of Algiers 

The Odjak of Algiers was a faction in the country which encompassed all janissaries. They often also controlled the country, for example during the period of Aghas from 1659 to 1671. They usually formed the main part of the army as one of the only regular unit they possessed.

The Odjak was initially mainly composed of foreigners as local tribes were deemed unreliable and their allegiance would often shift. Thus Janissaries were used to patrol rural tribal areas, and to garrison smaller forts in important locations and settlements (bordjs).

With the emancipation of Algiers from direct Ottoman control, and the worsening of relations with the Ottoman porte, the Odjak of Algiers became much less prominent. From there on, they only numbered in the thousands. A lot of the Janissaries, possibly the majority at some point albeit it is not clear, were recruited among Kouloughlis (mixed Algerian-Turks). Despite the fact that previously all locals were barred from joining the Odjak, Arabs, Berbers, and Moors were allowed to join it after 1710, as a way to replenish the unit. In 1803, 1 in 17 troops of the Odjak were Arabs and Berbers, and by 1830 the Odjak of Algiers possessed at least 2,000 native Algerian janissaries mainly from the Zwawa tribes. According to historian Daniel Panzac about 10-15% of the Odjak was composed of native Algerians and renegades (not counting Kouloughlis). By the 1820s, even Jewish people were allowed to join the Odjak of Algiers, although this was a highly controversial choice, and denounced by several members of the Algerian society.

The exact size of the Odjak varied greatly, and they were usually divided into several hundred smaller units (ortas). These units were mostly stationed in Algiers, Constantine, Mascara, Medea etc. although usually every town with a few thousand inhabitants had at least 1 orta stationed in it. Unlike the noubachis, regular units, and tribal levy, the Odjak had their own system of leadership, and they operated freely from the Beys and Deys.

Spahis of Algiers 
Not much is known about the Spahis of Algiers, other than the fact that they were a regular standing unit, and were mainly composed of locals (although there were Turks amongst them). They differed greatly from the traditional Ottoman Sipahis, in both military equipment, and organization, and hardly had anything in common with them other than their names, and both being cavalry units. The Dey also periodically possessed several thousand spahis in his service acting as a personal guard. Other than the Dey's guard, Spahis were not recruited or stationed in Algiers, instead being usually recruited by the Beys. They were usually more organized than the irregular tribal cavalry, although far less numerous.

The French Spahi units were based on the Algerian spahis, and they were both mainly light cavalry.

Modern style units 
Algiers hardly possessed units based on Napoleonic or post-Napoleonic warfare, and many of their units, including the Odjak of Algiers were organized on outdated 17th and 18th century Ottoman standards. The only two main units which existed as Modern-style units were the small Zwawa guard established by Ali Khodja Dey in 1817 to counter-balance the influence of the Odjak, and the small army of Ahmed Bey ben Mohamed Chérif, the last Bey of Constantine, who organized his army on the lines of Muhammad Ali's Egyptian Army. Ahmed Bey's army was composed of 2,000 infantry, and 1,500 cavalry. His entire army was composed of native Algerians, and he also built a complex system of manufactories to support the army and invited several foreigners to train technicians and other specialists.

Corsairs 
In 1625, Algiers' pirate fleet numbered 100 ships and employed 8,000 to 10,000 men. The piracy "industry" accounted for 25 percent of the workforce of the city, not counting other activities related directly to the port. The fleet averaged 25 ships in the 1680s, but these were larger vessels than had been used the 1620s, thus the fleet still employed some 7,000 men.

Leadership, and commanders

Main units 
The army was divided into 4 regions, the exact same regions as the administrational ones (Beyliks).

 Western Army, headed by the Beys of Mascara/Oran
 Central Army, headed by the Bey of Titteri
 Eastern Army, headed by the Bey of Constantine
 Dar as-Soltan army, headed by the Dey and the Agha.

These troops were headed by the Beys, and a Khalifa (general) appointed by them. The supreme commander of the army was the Agha al-Mahalla Levying these troops was the job of the Bey. The Odjak was headed by an Agha elected by the Odjak itself. When Algiers came under attack, the Beyliks would send their troops to help the besieged city, such as in 1775 during the Spanish Invasion of Algiers. As the Beys were regional commanders, they also fought the wars in their own region, occasionally reinforced by troops from the Dar as-Soltan army. For example, in 1792, during the reconquest of Oran the Bey of Oran, Mohamed el-Kébir (Bey of Oran) was the one to besiege the city using the army of the Beylik of the West, numbering up to 50,0000 with some additional reinforcements from Algiers. During the Algerian-Tunisian war of 1807 the Eastern army fought the war against the Tunisian armies. Its composition was 25,000 levy warriors from Constantine, and 5,000 reinforcements from Algiers. Sub-commanders usually included powerful tribal Sheiks, djouads, or caids.

Command structure of the Odjak of Algiers 
The command structure of the Odjak relied on several tiers of military commanders. Initially based on basic Janissary structures, after the 17th century it was slightly changed to better fit the local warfare styles and politics. The main ranks of the Odjak were:

 Agha, or marshall of the Odjak. Elected by the Odjak until 1817, after which the Dey appointed the Aghas.
 Aghabashi, which was equal to the rank of General in western armies
 Bulukbashi, or senior officer
 Odabashi, or officer
 Wakil al-Kharj, a non-commissioned officer or supply clerk
 Yoldash, or regular soldier

Economy

Monetary system 

Initially using various forms of Ottoman and old Zayyanid and Hafsid coins such as the Mangır (a sub-unit of the Akçe), Algiers soon developed its own monetary system, minting its own coins in the Casbah of Algiers and Tlemcen. The "central bank" of the state was located in the capital, and was known locally as the "Dâr al-Sikka".

In the 18th century the main categories of currencies produced locally and accepted in Algiers were:

 Algerian mahboub (Sultani), a gold coin weighing about 3.2g, with an inscription detailing the year it was produced and the year it will be decommissioned. Its production was discontinued under the reign of Baba Ali Bou Sebâa (1754-1766)
 Algerian budju, and the Algerian piastre, two types of silver coinage, the most widely used types of currency in Algeria. A budju was worth 24 mazounas and 48 kharoubs and was further divided into "rube'-budju" (1/4 boudjous), "thaman-budju" (1/8 budju)
 minor conversion coins made of copper or billon, such as mazounas or kharoubs
 minor coins of small value such as the saïme or pataque-chique

Algiers also had some European (mainly Spanish) and Ottoman coins in circulation.

Agriculture 
The agricultural production of the country was mediocre, although fallowing and crop rotation were the most common way of production, techniques and tools were obsolete by the 18th and 19th century. Agricultural products were varied: wheat, corn, cotton, rice, tobacco, watermelon and vegetables were the most commonly grown things. In and around towns grapes and pomegranates were cultivated. In mountainous areas of the country, fruit trees, figs and olive trees were grown. The main agricultural export of the country was wheat.

Milk was not often consumed and did not form a major part of the Algerian cuisine. The price of meat was low in Algeria before 1830, and many tribes brought in large amounts of income solely through the sale of cattle leather, although after the collapse of the Deylik and the arrival of the French the demand for cattle meat rapidly increased. Wool and lamb meat were also produced in very high numbers.

The majority of the western population south of the Tell Atlas and the people of the Sahara were pastoralists whose main produce was wool which was sometimes exported to be sold on the markets of the north, while the population in the north and east were settled in villages and did agriculture. The state and urban notables (mainly Arabs, Berbers, and Kouloughlis) owned lands near the main towns of the country which were cultivated by tenant farmers under the "khammas" system.

Manufacturing and craftsmanship 
Manufacturing was poorly developed and restricted to shipyards, but craftsmanship was rich and was present throughout the country. Cities were the seat of great craft and commercial activity. The urban people were mostly artisans and merchants, notably in Nedroma, Tlemcen, Oran, Mostaganem, Kalaa, Dellys, Blida, Médéa, Collo, M'Sila, Mila and Constantine. The most common forms of craftmanship were weaving, woodturning, dyeing and production of ropes, and various tools. In Algiers, a very large number of trades were practiced, and the city was home to many establishments: foundries, shipyards, various workshops, shops, and stalls. Tlemcen had more than 500 looms in it. Even in the small towns where the link with the rural world remained important, there were many craftsmen.

Despite this, Algerian products were severely outcompeted by European products especially after the start of the industrial revolution in the 1760s.

In the 1820s modern industry was first introduced by Ahmed Bey ben Mohamed Chérif who built and opened large numbers of manufactories in the east of the country mainly focused around military production.

Infrastructure 
The road system throughout Algeria was poorly developed, and often used neglected Roman roads. Generally transport and trade happened on the back of mules, donkeys, and camels. Rural roads controlled by autonomous Makhzen sheikhs were often unpredictable and sometimes dangerous thanks to bandits, although a few main roads often based on old roman ones were regularly policed and protected by authorities, such as the main road passing along the coast all the way to Tunis, and another one passing through the main cities of the inland regions.

Algiers possessed its own, very well developed sewage system based on ones found in Constantinople and Iberia.

Trade 
Internal trade was extremely important, especially thanks to the Makhzen system, and large amounts of products needed in cities such as wool were imported from inner tribes of the country, and needed products were exported city to city. Foreign trade was mainly conducted through the Mediterranean Sea and land exports to other neighbouring countries such as Tunisia and Morocco. When it came to land trade (both internal and external) transport was mainly done on the backs of animals, but carts were also used. The roads were suitable for vehicles, and many posts held by the Odjak and the Makhzen tribes provided security. In addition, caravanserais (known locally as fonduk) allowed travelers to rest.

Although control over the sahara was often loose, Algiers's economic ties with the sahara were very important, and Algiers and other Algerian cities were one of the main destinations of the Trans-Saharan slave trade.

Political status

1518-1671 
In between 1518 and 1671, the rulers of the Regency were chosen by the Ottoman sultan. During the first few decades, Algiers was completely aligned with the Ottoman Empire, although it later gained a certain level of autonomy as it was the westernmost province of the Ottoman Empire, and administering it directly would have been problematic.

1671-1710 
During this period a form of dual leadership was in place, with the Aghas sharing power and influence with a Pasha appointed by the Ottoman sultan from Constantinople. After 1671, the Deys became the main leaders of the country, although the Pashas still retained some power.

1710-1830 
After a coup by Baba Ali Chaouch, the political situation of Algiers became complicated.

Relation with the Ottoman Empire 
Some sources describe it as completely independent from the Ottomans, albeit the state was still nominally part of the Ottoman Empire.

Cur Abdy, dey of Algiers shouted at an Ottoman envoy for claiming that the Ottoman Padishah was the king of Algiers ("King of Algiers? King of Algiers? If he is the King of Algiers then who am I?").

Despite the Ottomans having no influence in Algiers, and the Algerians often ignoring orders from the Ottoman sultan, such as in 1784. In some cases Algiers also participated in the Ottoman Empire's wars, such as the Russo-Turkish War (1787–1792), albeit this was not common, and in 1798 for example Algiers sold wheat to the French Empire campaigning in Egypt against the Ottomans through two Jewish traders.

In some cases, Algiers was declared to be a country rebelling against the holy law of Islam by the Ottoman Caliph. This usually meant a declaration of war by the Ottomans against the Deylik of Algiers. This could happen due to many reasons. For example, under the rule of Haji Ali Dey, Algerian pirates regularly attacked Ottoman shipments, and Algiers waged war against the Beylik of Tunis, despite several protests by the Ottoman Porte, which resulted in a declaration of war.

It can be thus said that the relationship between the Ottoman Empire and Algiers mainly depended on what the Dey at the time wanted. While in some cases, if the relationship between the two was favorable, Algiers did participate in Ottoman wars, Algiers otherwise remained completely autonomous from the rest of the Empire similar to the other Barbary States.

Healthcare 

Several hospitals were present throughout the bigger cities in Algeria, especially Algiers. There existed hospitals in Algeria before the establishment of the Regency, and the first hospital built by the authorities of Algiers was built by Hassan Veneziano in the 1570s to treat military personnel. Just before the French invasion, the city of Algiers itself housed two Military hospitals one known as the "Hospital of the Dey" capable of housing 2,000 sick, and another called the "Mustapha hospital" capable of housing 800. When under Algerian rule from 1708 to 1732, several hospitals were built in Oran by Mustapha Bouchelaghem Bey. Cities known to have hospitals were Algiers, Oran, Constantine, Tlemcen, Médéa, Béjaïa, and many more.

The Algerian administration donated under charities to existing small infirmaries and hospices. it designated several lands in cities under the law of Waqf (known as hubous locally), for use of public baths, water fountains, schools and hospices and asylums for the sick and vulnerable, along with sometimes distributing corsair loot to such establishments. Many infirmaries, hospitals and hospices were directly tied to mosques under waqf designation, operating next to them, or sometimes inside of them. There also existed some charitable hospices maintained directly by the state made for taking care of the poor and infirm, the largest of which was the Sidi Ouali Dada hospice in Algiers, which was directly tied to the Sidi Ouali Dada mosque.

There existed a Christian hospital operated by the Lazarist society used to treat Christians in Algeria and European diplomats, along with a small hospital financed by the Kings of Spain and Portugal and operated by priests for treating, taking care of, and burying Christian slaves. The authorities of Algiers allowed this institution to exist for a sum of $40,000/year (approximately $1,270,800 in modern-day dollars adjusted for inflation), although they personally never invested into the building of edifices made for taking care of Christians. Algiers was not the only city possessing hospitals for taking care of Christians, both free and enslaved. The city of Tlemcen possessed 12 hospitals in total, 4 of which were "Moor" hospitals (some of which were built by the Zayyanid dynasty) made for taking care of the urban Muslim population, 2 of which were Christian hospitals maintained by the Venetians and the Republic of Genoa, and 6 of which were smaller hospitals for "foreigners" (such as merchants, local tribesmen, etc.) and Jews.

Education 

Education in Algeria was done mainly through small primary schools focused on teaching reading, writing, religious basics and other such skills, while in rural areas especially, most of education was done by local Imams, zawiyas, marabouts, and elders. Secondary and tertiary education could be pursued in various madrasas located mainly in bigger cities of the country, often maintained through waqf and Islamic donations from the central government. The levels of these madrasas varied, and the biggest madrasas functioned as both places of secondary and tertiary learning. Algiers alone had several madrasas, zawiyas, and midrashims (Jewish schools), and also having very famous bookstores "warraqates" located throughout the city. The state of these madrasas depended mainly on the stance of the local authorities at the time. Initially, western Algeria, especially the city of Tlemcen was the main center of learning in the country, but thanks to negligence, these schools and universities declined with some, mainly Abu Hammu II's madrasa falling into complete ruin. The decline was only stopped when Mohammed el Kebir, Bey of Oran made a significant investment into the complete renovation and rebuilding of several places of education throughout the region, although many of these centuries old madrasas, such as the Tashfiniya Madrasa fell into ruin and neglect under French rule, and many were demolished by the French. Most major mosques of the country also possessed Quranic schools in them.

Demography 

The total population of the Regency of Algiers is a highly debated subject. The best estimates put it between 3,000,000 and 5,000,0000, although Algerian dignitary Hamdan Khodja estimated the total population of Algeria to be about 10,000,000 before the French invasion in his book written in 1833. In 1830, there were about 10,000 'Turks' (including people from Kurdish, Greek and Albanian ancestry) and 5,000 Kouloughli civilians (from the Turkish kul oğlu, "son of slaves (Janissaries)", i.e. creole of Turks and local women). By 1830, more than 17,000 Jews were living in the Regency.

Architecture 

During this period Algiers developed into a major town and witnessed regular architectural patronage, and as such most of the major monuments from this period are concentrated there. By contrast, the city of Tlemcen, the former major capital of the region, went into relative decline and saw far less architectural activity. Mosque architecture in Algiers during this period demonstrates the convergence of multiple influences as well as peculiarities that may be attributed to the innovations of local architects. Domes of Ottoman influence were introduced into the design of mosques, but minarets generally continued to be built with square shafts instead of round or octagonal ones, thus retaining local tradition, unlike contemporary architecture in Ottoman Tunisia and other Ottoman provinces, where the "pencil"-shaped minaret was a symbol of Ottoman sovereignty. The oldest surviving mosque from this era is the Ali Bitchin (or 'Ali Bitshin) Mosque in Algiers, commissioned by Ali Bitchin in 1622. The most significant mosque of this era is the New Mosque (Djamaa el-Djedid) in Algiers, built in 1660–1661 by al-Hajj Habib, which became one of the most important Hanafi mosques in the city.

A citadel, the qasba (origin of the name "Casbah"), occupied the highest point of the town. By the end of the 18th century the city had over 120 mosques, including over a dozen congregational mosques. The lower part of the city, near the shore, was the center of the Ottoman and Regency administration, containing the most important markets, mosques, wealthy residences, Janissary barracks, government buildings (like the mint), and palaces. The residential palace of the ruler in Algiers, the Janina or Jenina ('Little Garden'), was situated at the center of a larger palatial complex known as the Dar al-Sultan in the lower part of the city. This complex served as the ruling palace until 1816, when the Dey moved to the qasba following a British bombardment of the city that year. The only example of architecture from the Dar al-Sultan complex that is still preserved today is the Dar 'Aziza Bint al-Bey, believed to have been built in the 16th century.

See also
 List of Ottoman governors of Algiers
 Conflicts between the Regency of Algiers and the Cherifian Dynasties

Notes

References

Bibliography 

Pierre Boyer, « Le problème Kouloughli dans la régence d'Alger», Revue de l'Occident musulman et de la Méditerranée, vol. 8, no 1, 1970, p. 79-94 (ISSN 0035-1474, DOI 10.3406/remmm.1970.1033)

 
Algiers, Regency of
States and territories established in 1516
States and territories disestablished in 1830
Algiers, Regency of
Eyalets of the Ottoman Empire in Africa
1516 establishments in the Ottoman Empire
1516 establishments in Africa
1830s disestablishments in Africa
16th century in Algiers
Barbary Coast